Rajiv Goswami (12 June 1971 – 24 February 2004) was a commerce student at the Deshbandhu College, Delhi University who came into prominence when he attempted self-immolation on 19 September 1990 to protest against Prime Minister V.P. Singh's implementation of the Mandal Commission recommendations for job reservations for backward castes in India. Goswami spearheaded a formidable movement against the Mandal Commission and his act of self-immolation led to larger protests and a series of self-immolations by college students throughout India. During Mandal commission agitation, the AIIMS intersection in Delhi was temporarily renamed by students to Rajiv Chowk in a celebration of his act.

Subsequently, he was elected to position of the Delhi University Students' Union president. He later gave up active politics due to health problems and started his own business. In the following years he was frequently in and out of hospitals because of severe health complications resulting from his self-immolation bid.

He was a resident of Gomti Apartments at Kalkaji in New Delhi. He died on 24 February 2004 at the age of 33 in Holy Family Hospital Okhla, New Delhi. His mother, Nandrani Goswami, was one of the speakers at anti reservation protests in 2006.

See also
 Mandal Commission protests of 1990

References

External links
Rajiv Goswami attempting self immolation
Obituary
The man who sparked anti-Mandal agitation
Pioneer of anti-Mandal stir dies
Why India forgot a hero
Young men at the barricades

2004 suicides
Suicides by self-immolation
Reservation in India
Presidents of Delhi University Students Union
People from Delhi
Suicides in India
1971 births
Student politics in India